The 2015 Pure Michigan 400 was a NASCAR Sprint Cup Series race held on August 16, 2015, at Michigan International Speedway in Brooklyn, Michigan. Contested over 200 laps on the 2 mile (3.2 km) D–shaped oval, it was the 23rd race of the 2015 NASCAR Sprint Cup Series season. Matt Kenseth won the race, his third of the season. Kevin Harvick finished second. Martin Truex Jr. finished third. Austin Dillon and Denny Hamlin rounded out the top five.

Kenseth won the pole for the race and led 146 laps on his way to victory lane. There were 16 lead changes among eight different drivers as well as eight caution flag periods for 31 laps.

This was the 34th career victory for Matt Kenseth, third of the season, third at Michigan International Speedway and eighth at the track for Joe Gibbs Racing. Despite being the winning manufacturer, Toyota left Michigan trailing Chevrolet by 70–points in the manufacturer standings. However, they usurped second in the standings from Ford.

The Pure Michigan 400 was carried by NBC Sports on the cable/satellite NBCSN network for the American television audience. The radio broadcast for the race was carried by the Motor Racing Network and Sirius XM NASCAR Radio.

Report

Background

The track is used primarily for NASCAR events. It is sometimes known as a "sister track" to Texas World Speedway, and was used as the basis of Auto Club Speedway. The track is owned by International Speedway Corporation (ISC). Michigan International Speedway is recognized as one of motorsports' premier facilities because of its wide racing surface and high banking (by open-wheel standards; the 18-degree banking is modest by stock car standards).

Kevin Harvick entered Michigan with a 42–point lead over Joey Logano. Dale Earnhardt Jr. entered 73 back. Jimmie Johnson entered 76 back. Brad Keselowski entered 104 back.

Aero package
For the weekend's race, NASCAR used the same high–drag package that was used at the Indianapolis Motor Speedway. One change from the Indy package included an additional air duct mandated on the right–side window of the car. Previously, this was an option left up to the teams. What led NASCAR to mandating this was the excessive heat buildup in the cars caused by the high–downforce package. "I would not be surprised to see a lot of car failures this weekend, specific to heat relation as it pertains to the aero package and its kind of cause and effects," Brad Keselowski said during a teleconference Tuesday. "And inside the car I would not be surprised to see a lot of hot and worn out drivers after the race. We all know we’re in for a handful of the race."

Entry list
The entry list for the Pure Michigan 400 was released on Monday, August 10 at 10:31 a.m. Eastern time. Forty-four cars were entered for the race. All but the No. 21 Wood Brothers Racing Ford were entered in the previous week's race at Watkins Glen. The four driver changes for this race were Josh Wise returning to the No. 32 Go FAS Racing Ford, Travis Kvapil driving the No. 33 Hillman-Circle Sport LLC Chevrolet, Brett Moffitt returning to the No. 34 Front Row Motorsports Ford and Reed Sorenson returning to the No. 62 Premium Motorsports Chevrolet.

First practice

Qualifying
"We’ve had a fast racecar here this weekend," said Kenseth. "Hopefully, we can work on it in practice and get it ready to race. Having the No. 1 starting spot is great." "We aren’t first so we aren’t satisfied," said Joey Logano. "Qualifying here is very interesting. I had my hands full, I can tell you that much. I was sawing away at it but we'll be close enough to the front to get a good pit stall, so the guys have that going for them. We'll go to work on dialing it in some more during practice." "Tomorrow (Saturday), we'll run more around other cars and learn more about what the (aero) package is going to be like for the race," Jeff Gordon said of the new rules package. "We won’t truly know until they drop the green and there are 43 cars going into Turn 1."

Qualifying results

Practice (post-qualifying)

Second practice

Final practice
In the first five minutes of the session, Kyle Busch's car got loose exiting turn 4, slid down through the grass and destroyed the splitter. This forced the No. 18 team to roll out his backup car. As a result, he started the race from the rear of the field. “I was just running along, everything was fine and I was actually feeling pretty good about it,” Busch said. “Just started to get a little free up off of (turn) four. It started stepping out like it did here in the spring. I over-corrected and hit the wall so this time around I just kind of made it keep rotating and head down towards the infield. I think we need more grass at these race tracks, I think the apron should be full of grass.” In the final few minutes of the session, Austin Dillon reported that his engine had "No RPM's" and was forced to change engines. As a result, he too started the race from the rear of the field.

Race

First half

Start
Just as the field began rolling off pit road, Timmy Hill blew his engine and went to the garage before the green flag flew.

The race was scheduled to start at 2:46 p.m., but started nine minutes later when Matt Kenseth led the field to the green flag. The first caution of the race flew the same lap when David Ragan got sideways and spun through the infield grass while heading into turn 1.

The race restarted on lap 6. The second caution of the race flew on lap 10 for debris in turn 3. The debris was an oil pan that came off Hill's car, which recently returned to the race.

The race restarted on lap 14. The third caution of the race flew on lap 21 as a scheduled competition caution. Austin Dillon opted not to pit and assumed the lead. Kasey Kahne was tagged for speeding on pit road and restarted from the tail-end of the field.

The race restarted on lap 25. Dillon surrendered the lead to pit on lap 41 and handed it back to Kenseth. Jimmie Johnson made an unscheduled stop on lap 49 for a flat right-rear tire. He rejoined the race in 42nd two laps down. Casey Mears hit pit road on lap 54 after his engine gave way. Kenseth ducked onto pit road on lap 59 and handed the lead to Kyle Larson, who pitted the next lap and handed the lead to Jeff Gordon. He hit pit road the next time by and gave the lead to Kyle Busch. Busch pitted the next lap and gave the lead back to Kenseth. Michael Annett was tagged for having his pit crew over the wall too soon and was forced to serve a drive-through penalty.

Second quarter
The fourth caution of the race came out on lap 72 for debris in turn 2.

The race restarted on lap 77. Matt Kenseth hit pit road on lap 99 and handed the lead to Kevin Harvick.

Second half

Halfway
Harvick ran out of gas on lap 114 on his way to pit road. Carl Edwards assumed the lead. He pitted on lap 116 and handed the lead to Kenseth. Debris in turn 1 brought out the fifth caution of the race on lap 121. Edwards opted not to pit and assumed the lead.

The race restarted on lap 126. Edwards botched the restart and teammate Kenseth shot past Austin Dillon to retake the lead. The sixth caution of the race flew when Clint Bowyer got turned into the wall while exiting turn 2, came down across the nose of Ryan Newman, slid down the track and rear-ended the inside wall on the backstretch. "Man, I'm sorry guys," Bowyer radioed to his team. "I couldn't save it. Good track for us."

The race restarted on lap 131. The seventh caution of the race flew on lap 136 when Tony Stewart got loose and spun down onto pit road and Ryan Blaney, trying to avoid hitting him, made contact with the wall. Edwards had an engine misfire under the caution and fell from second to 12th.

Fourth quarter

The race restarted with 59 laps to go. A number of cars began hitting pit road to make their final stop with 38 laps to go. Kenseth gave up the lead to pit with 36 laps to go and handed it to Busch. He pitted with 28 laps to go and handed the lead to Aric Almirola. He pitted with 25 laps to go and the lead cycled back to Kenseth.

The eighth caution of the race flew with 17 laps to go when Johnson got loose in turn 3 and damaged his car's splitter.

The race restarted with 13 laps to go and Matt Kenseth drove off to score his 34th career victory.

Post-race

Driver comments
"We've had a great couple months," said Kenseth. "We definitely have momentum. The guys gave us a rocket today. We're going to work hard to keep it rolling."

“We just fought a lot of things today,” Harvick said. “Just really proud of everybody on our Jimmy John’s/Budweiser Chevrolet for fighting back today.  We had some handling issues at the beginning of the race and then they were able to really make the car handle a lot better and then we overcame the running out of gas there and we were able to put ourselves back in position up in the front. The No. 20 (Kenseth) was the class of the field today, but everybody on our Jimmy John’s team did a great job.”

“Yeah, we had some circumstances where we had to start at the back and had to figure out a way to get our track position back, and just got to thank my guys,” said Austin Dillon after scoring his best career finish of fourth. "(Crew chief) Slugger Labbe and the engineers did a good job coming up with a plan.  That first 20 laps was no fun for us because we had to ride around and try and stay in front of the leader, but we saved gas and decided to not come down on that first competition caution for fuel, and it worked out. It showed that our car was fast enough to stay up there, pitted, drove back up to where we needed to be, and man, it was a fun day for us, the Dow car was fast, and I felt like I passed a lot of cars, also, getting into fourth.”

“We passed a lot of cars, we just couldn’t ever get that track position to fight for the win,” Martin Truex Jr. told NBCSN after the race. “We felt like we were maybe as good as the No. 20 (winner, Matt Kenseth), close at least, and it would have been nice to see if we could have fought it out with him.”

Media comments

Members of the NASCAR media gave their thoughts on the high-downforce package used for this race. Pete Pistone, lead writer for MRN.com and co-host of The Morning Drive on Sirius XM NASCAR Radio, said that he continued "to applaud NASCAR for trying rule packages in an effort to improve the competition" but that "it’s apparent the high drag package used at Indianapolis and Michigan is not the right direction."

Jerry Jordan of Frontstretch.com said that "it didn’t seem to produce the desired results at Michigan International Speedway" but that he did "applaud NASCAR for trying something new and wanting to make the racing better – and safer – on the track."

Jim Utter of Motorsport.com was less kind in his opinion of the rules package in saying that it "was a complete failure at its debut at Indianapolis Motor Speedway last month and again in Sunday’s Pure Michigan 400 at Michigan International Speedway" and that "restarts were the only thing that created any drama in either race."

Monte Dutton of Bleacher Report stated that "NASCAR’s rules geniuses botched the package used in the Pure Michigan 400."

Race results

Race statistics
16 lead changes among 8 different drivers
8 cautions for 31 laps
Time of race: 2 hours, 47 minute, 18 seconds
Average speed: 
Matt Kenseth took home $226.586 in winnings

Race awards
 Coors Light Pole Award: Matt Kenseth (36.458)
 3M Lap Leader: Matt Kenseth (146 laps)
 American Ethanol Green Flag Restart Award: Matt Kenseth
 Duralast Brakes "Bake In The Race" Award: Matt Kenseth
 Freescale "Wide Open": Kevin Harvick
 Ingersoll Rand Power Move: Ryan Newman (5 positions)
 MAHLE Clevite Engine Builder of the Race: Toyota Racing Development #20
 Mobil 1 Driver of the Race: Matt Kenseth (148.8 driver rating)
 Moog Steering and Suspension Problem Solver of The Race: Kevin Harvick (crew chief Rodney Childers (0.300 seconds))
 NASCAR Sprint Cup Leader Bonus: No winner: rolls over to $200,000 at next event
 Sherwin-Williams Fastest Lap: Austin Dillon (Lap 26, 37.985)
 Sunoco Rookie of The Race: Matt DiBenedetto

Media

Television
NBC Sports covered the race on the television side. Rick Allen, Jeff Burton and Steve Letarte had the call in the booth for the race. Dave Burns, Mike Massaro, Marty Snider and Kelli Stavast handled pit road on the television side.

Radio
MRN had the radio call for the race, which was simulcast on Sirius XM NASCAR Radio. Joe Moore, Jeff Striegle and five–time Michigan winner Rusty Wallace called the race from the booth when the field was racing down the front stretch. Dave Moody called the race from a billboard outside of turn 2 when the field was racing through turns 1 and 2. Kurt Becker called the race from a platform outside of turn 3 when the field was racing through turns 3 and 4. Alex Hayden, Winston Kelley and Pete Pistone worked pit road for MRN.

Standings after the race

Drivers' Championship standings

Manufacturers' Championship standings

Note: Only the first sixteen positions are included for the driver standings.

Notes

References

Pure Michigan 400
Pure Michigan 400
NASCAR races at Michigan International Speedway